The Embassy of Indonesia in Paris, is the diplomatic mission of Indonesia in France. The Embassy is accredited to France, Monaco, and Andorra. It is located at 47-49 rue Cortambert, in the 16th arrondissement of Paris, the French capital city. The current ambassador is Mohamad Oemar since 2021.

History 
On 26 May 1962, the embassy was attacked with plastic explosives placed on a windowsill on the ground floor of the embassy.

On 8 October 2004, a bomb exploded in front of the embassy, slightly injuring ten people. The  claimed the attack.

In the morning of 21 March 2012, a letter bomb exploded in front of the embassy without injuring anyone, but caused serious damage to cars and windows within a fifty metre radius.

Consulates 
As well as its embassy in Paris, Indonesia has two consulates in Marseille, Bouches-du-Rhône and in Nouméa, New Caledonia.

References

External links 

 
 
 

France
16th arrondissement of Paris
Indonesia
France–Indonesia relations